Waqas Ahmed may refer to:

 Waqas Ahmed (Norwegian cricketer) (born 1991), Norwegian cricketer 
 Waqas Ahmed (cricketer, born 1992), Pakistani cricketer
 Waqas Ahmed (cricketer, born 1979), Pakistani cricketer
 Waqas Ahmed, perpetrator of the 2012 Paros beating and rape
 Waqas Ahmed, Pakistani journalist, author and editor of Daily Pakistan Global.
 Waqas Ahmed, British interdisciplinary scholar, author of 2018 non-fiction book The Polymath